The 2007 Louisiana gubernatorial election was held on October 20. The filing deadline for candidates was September 6. On the day of the election, all 12 candidates competed in an open jungle primary. Bobby Jindal won the election with 54%. This was the first time since 1967 in which the winner of a Louisiana gubernatorial election was of the same party as the incumbent president.

Background
Elections in Louisiana, with the exception of U.S. presidential elections (and congressional races from 2008 until 2010), follow a variation of the open primary system called the jungle primary. Candidates of any and all parties are listed on one ballot; voters need not limit themselves to the candidates of one party. Unless one candidate takes more than 50% of the vote in the first round, a run-off election is then held between the top two candidates, who may in fact be members of the same party. This scenario occurred in the 7th District congressional race in 1996, when Democrats Chris John and Hunter Lundy made the runoff for the open seat, and in 1999, when Republicans Suzanne Haik Terrell and Woody Jenkins made the runoff for Commissioner of Elections.

Candidates

Democratic
Walter Boasso – Elected to the State Senate in 2003, representing St. Bernard Parish and Plaquemines Parish. He is also president and CEO of Boasso America Corp., a network of shipping container facilities, and has served on the Port of New Orleans Board of Commissioners.  He has received a reputation  as a conservative, pro-business legislator.  After Hurricane Katrina, Boasso achieved prominence as one for the state's leading advocates for consolidation and reform of the state's Levee Boards.  He switched to the Democratic Party on April 26, 2007.
Foster Campbell – Louisiana Public Service Commissioner for District 5, 2002 – Present; St. Senator, 1976-2002.  Campbell is a cattle farmer and owner of an insurance agency from Bossier Parish. As a state senator and as a Public Service Commissioner, Campbell pushed to regulate and lower utility rates.  A centerpiece of his populist campaign is a proposal to tax foreign oil refined in Louisiana and use the proceeds to eliminate personal income tax.
Vinny Mendoza – Kenner resident. Veteran of the Korean War and has run for many state offices.
Hardy Parkerson – Lake Charles attorney. He ran as a self-described "Ronald Reagan Conservative Democratic, Family Forum, Christian-Coalition, States' Rights, anti-abortion candidate."
Mary Volentine Smith – Retired Hairdresser from Winnsboro.

Republicans
Bobby Jindal – A U.S. Congressman representing Louisiana's First Congressional District.  Jindal previously served as Louisiana's Secretary of Health and Hospitals from 1996 to 1998 and President of the University of Louisiana System from 1999 to 2001, and was appointed by President George W. Bush as Assistant Secretary of Health and Human Services for Planning and Evaluation from 2001 to 2003.  Jindal ran against Kathleen Blanco for governor in 2003, and was narrowly defeated, having received 48% of the vote.

Libertarian
T. Lee Horne, III – real estate salesman from Franklin

Independent
Belinda Alexandrenko – Lafayette resident who previously ran for governor in 1995 & 1999. In 1999, she received 0.69% of the vote and did not run in 2003.
Sheldon Forest – Maurice resident.
Anthony "Tony G" Gentile – oil refinery supervisor from Mandeville
John Georges – Georges is a wealthy New Orleans businessman with investments in gaming and grocery businesses; owner of the Baton Rouge Morning Advocate.
Jim Nichols – Donaldsonville resident who previously ran for governor in 1995.

Campaign

Blanco's faltering popularity
Originally planning to run for re-election, the incumbent governor, Kathleen Babineaux Blanco, entered the election year with a significant erosion in her level of popular support, due in large part to perceptions of inadequate performance in the aftermath of Hurricane Katrina.  In November 2006, Blanco had an approval rating of 39%,  and she had encountered further political setbacks since November.

In December 2006, Blanco called a special session of the Louisiana State Legislature which she intended to use to dispense $2.1 billion worth of tax cuts, teacher raises, road projects and other spending programs.  Legislators allied with Blanco attempted to lift a spending cap imposed by the state constitution, but Republican lawmakers defeated Blanco's spending measures.  The high-profile defeat further eroded Blanco's political reputation.

By late 2006 and early 2007, Blanco was facing increasingly heated accusations of delays and incompetence in administering the Road Home Program, a state-run program which Blanco had set up following Katrina in order to distribute federal aid money to Katrina victims for damage to their homes. By January 2007, fewer than 250 of an estimated 100,000 applicants had received payments from the program, and many of the payments were apparently based on assessments which grossly undervalued the cost of damage to homes.

By January 2007, the first opinion polls of the campaign showed Blanco trailing expected opponent Bobby Jindal by over 20 percentage points. Facing an upcoming re-election campaign with greatly reduced popularity, Blanco began her campaign by making repeated public criticisms of the administration of President George W. Bush in January 2007. Noting that Bush neglected to mention Gulf Coast reconstruction in his 2007 State of the Union Address, Blanco called for a bipartisan Congressional investigation into the conduct of the Bush administration following Katrina, to determine whether partisan politics played a role in the slow response to the storm. This call followed comments by disgraced former Federal Emergency Management Agency (FEMA) director Michael D. Brown, who claimed that the White House had planned to upstage Blanco by federalizing the National Guard in the days following the storm. Blanco also repeated accusations that Mississippi received preferential treatment because its governor, Haley Barbour, is a Republican.

Democrats drop/decline
Beginning in February 2007, speculation grew among Louisiana political commentators that former U.S. Senator and current Washington, D.C. lobbyist John Breaux would announce his candidacy. However, controversy emerged as to whether Breaux would meet the residency requirements to run for governor as he had listed his primary address in Maryland since 2005 and was registered to vote there.  

On March 20, 2007, Blanco announced that she would not be running for re-election.  She stated that removing herself from the campaign would allow her to focus the remainder of her term on Louisiana's recovery without the distraction of campaigning for re-election.   But her announcement came after weeks of growing calls from members of the Louisiana Democratic party for her to step aside and allow a more popular candidate to face Jindal.

On March 29, John Breaux made his first Louisiana public appearance since speculation began concerning his potential candidacy.  Breaux said that he intended to run, and would announce his candidacy as soon as Louisiana Attorney General Charles Foti, a Democrat, gave a formal legal opinion on whether Breaux was eligible to run.  At issue was the clause in the Louisiana constitution which states that a candidate for governor must be a 'citizen' of the State of Louisiana; what constitutes a citizen is not defined.  The state Republican party began running advertisements attacking Breaux as a resident of Maryland.

On April 13, Breaux released a statement that he would not be running for governor.   Attorney General Foti had declined to issue an opinion on Breaux's eligibility, stating it was an issue for the courts to decide.  Breaux stated that he did not want the issue of eligibility to overshadow his campaign, as a court challenge would not occur until September.

On April 17, Lt. Gov. Mitch Landrieu also declined to run leaving the field very open on the Democratic side.  Due to the lack of a high-profile Democratic candidate, party leaders approached Republican State Senator Walter Boasso about switching parties; Boasso formally switched to the Democratic Party on April 26.

Republican fundraising efforts
As of the April 2007 reports, two Republican candidates have emerged with the largest campaign warchests in Louisiana history – Georges with $5.5 million cash on hand and Jindal who has received $5 million in campaign financing.  The financial strength of the two Republicans presented a tremendous challenge to recruiting a strong candidate for the Democratic party. Georges, however, later left the Louisiana GOP and registered as an independent for the gubernatorial race.

Democratic attack on Jindal's religious writings
An ad campaign by the Louisiana Democratic Party launched in late August, 2007 which attacked Bobby Jindal on the basis of supposed inflammatory remarks made about Protestantism.  The ad was solely aired in the largely Protestant central and northern districts of the state.  The ad drew attention to essays Jindal had written over a decade previously discussing his Catholic faith and conversion.  One such essay titled "How Catholicism Is Different – The Catholic Church Isn't Just Another Denomination" was published in 1996 in the New Oxford Review.  Jindal said about the ad, "They're absolute lies. We're not talking about an exaggeration".  A letter from the campaign went further to say "each claim made in the advertisement distorts Mr. Jindal's positions with false and grossly distorted statements."

Polling

Results

See also
2007 United States gubernatorial elections
State of Louisiana
Governors of Louisiana

References

External links
Louisiana Secretary of State

Campaign sites

Democratic
Walter Boasso for Governor web site
Foster Campbell for Governor web site

Republican
Bobby Jindal for Governor web site

Libertarian
T. Lee Horne for Governor web site

Independent
Anthony Gentile for Governor web site
John Georges for Governor web site

Governor
2007
Louisiana
November 2007 events in the United States